Lubna or Lubná may refer to:

Places

Czech Republic
Lubná (Kroměříž District), a municipality and village in the Zlín Region
Lubná (Rakovník District), a municipality and village in the Central Bohemian Region
Lubná (Svitavy District), a municipality and village in the Pardubice Region

Poland
Łubna, Masovian Voivodeship, Poland
Łubna, Pomeranian Voivodeship, Poland

People
Lubna, an Arabic female given name
Lubna Agha, Pakistani artist
Lubna Azabal, Belgian actress
Lubna Jaffery, Norwegian politician
Lubna al-Hussein, Sudanese journalist
Lubna of Córdoba, 10th century poet
Lubna Olayan, Saudi businesswoman
Lubna Khalid Al Qasimi, first woman to hold a ministerial post in the United Arab Emirates
Lubna Salim, Indian theater and television actress

Other
Lubna, transcribed Arabic for storax, the aromatic sap of the sweetgum tree used for making incense and perfume
Lubna, a fictional character from the graphic novel series RanXerox
Qays and Lubna, a virgin love story of the 7th century in Arabic literature